Acanthosicyos naudinianus, known as the Gemsbok cucumber, is a perennial African melon with edible fruits and seeds.

Description
The leaves are typically deeply palmately 5-lobed and alternately arranged, while the stem may reach 6 meters long. The stems feature tendrils which have been modified into weak spines. The flowers are yellow or white. It is dioecious, with male and female flowers on separate plants. The fruit, which is 4-12 centimeters long and covered in spines, starts out green and becomes a pale yellow when ripe. The fruit is edible, but eating it before it is ripe will cause a burning sensation in one's mouth. It is not poisonous, but it can be combined with the blood of the larva of the Diamphidia beetle to produce a poison which can be used to make poison arrows. The tuberous roots, which may reach 1 meter long, are poisonous.

Distribution and habitat
A. naudinianus is found in southern Africa, specifically Namibia, Zambia, Zimbabwe, Botswana, Mozambique, and South Africa. Its native habitat is woodland, wooded grasslands, and grasslands. It prefers sandy soil and does not tolerate frost. It may be grown in USDA zone 9.

References

External links
PROTAbase on Acanthosicyos naudinianus

Fruits originating in Africa
Cucurbitoideae
Taxa named by Otto Wilhelm Sonder
Plants described in 1862